Brenner Vineyards Historic District, near Doniphan, Kansas, includes history dating from 1867.  It is a  historic district which was listed on the National Register of Historic Places in 2005. It has also been known as the Adam Brenner and Jacob Brenner Farmsteads.
 
It includes Classical Revival architecture.  The district included eight contributing buildings and one contributing site.

It includes two parcels southwest and northwest of the intersection of Mineral Point and 95th Roads.

References

Historic districts on the National Register of Historic Places in Kansas
Neoclassical architecture in Kansas
Buildings and structures completed in 1867
Doniphan County, Kansas